Shadows of Paragon is an Unblack metal band that originated in Sweden in 2001 under the moniker, Allsherjar. The band has played in the Netherlands and Belgium.

Background
Shadows of Paragon formed in 2001 under the name Allsherjar. The band changed the name in 2003, and have been active since. The band released a demo in 2004 before having Keyboardist Jocke Bergkvist depart from the band. Before recording further, Drummer Joel Oredsson quit being replaced by Inevitable End drummer Christoffer Johansson. The band released an EP in 2008 and a Studio album in 2009. 2014 saw the departure of both Vocalist Karg and Johansson. The band is currently recording their sophomore album, with their new drummer, Arvid.

The band announced in 2021 that their sophomore album, Amendment, would be able to be released, after 12 years of long work. The album would be produced by Zharlie Sambeko and Fredrik Bergman out of Svartkog Productions. The new album would feature newer members David Rönnlund on vocals and Arvid Borg on drums.

Members
Current
David Rönnlund - Vocals (2019–present)
Fredrik "Jörundr" Bergman - Bass (2001–present)
Linus Bergman - Guitar (2001–present)
Zharlie Sambeko - Guitar (2001–present)
Arvid Borg - Drums (2016–present)

Former
Kristoffer "Karg" Petersson - Vocals (2001-2014)
Christoffer Johansson - Drums (2007-2014)
Joel Oredsson - Drums (2001-2007)
Jocke Bergkvist - Keyboards (2001-2004)

Timeline

Discography
EPs
Shadows of Paragon (2004)
Fear of Being Forever Lost (2008)

Studio albums
Through the Valley Within (2009)
Amendment (2021)

References

External links
 Retrieved on October 6, 2016.

Christian metal musical groups
Musical groups established in 2001